PocketShip is a stitch-and-glue pocket cruiser sailboat designed by John C. Harris of Chesapeake Light Craft.

History

The first PocketShip hull was built by Geoff Kerr at Two Daughters Boatworks in Westford, Vermont. Commencing in mid-January 2008, it took Kerr 525 hours to complete the hull and spars. The hull was rigged at Chesapeake Light Craft in Annapolis, Maryland, and launched on May 10, 2008. Sailing trials were completed in various waters from Maine to Maryland with crews of 1–4 adults in winds of up to 20 knots.

As of February 2010, PocketShips have been completed or are under construction in the United States, Canada, France, Australia, and Japan.

Design

The PocketShip is a "refined model, meant to sail well on all points, provide dry camping accommodations for one or two adults, and tow behind a four-cylinder car." The cockpit was designed for comfortable daysailing and can be used for sleeping if necessary. A portable head stows beneath the cockpit, sliding forward into the cuddy for use.

Auxiliary propulsion can be provided with a pair of oars, a yuloh, or a small outboard motor.

Rigging
PocketShips are single-masted sloops set with a gaff-rigged mainsail and a roller-furled jib. A spinnaker may be set for flying downwind.

Notes

Further reading
Harris, John C. How to Build PocketShip. Matt Cordrey, ed. Annapolis: Chesapeake Light Craft, 2008.
 – Manual for PocketShip construction; available from Chesapeake Light Craft.
Harris, John C. "Plan Study: PocketShip." Small Craft Advisor 55 (January/February 2008 [2009]): 52–53.
 – Overview of PocketShip by the designer; available from Small Craft Advisor.
Segal, Dan. "Small and Simple Cruising: The PocketShip from Chesapeake Light Craft." WoodenBoat 207 (March/April 2009): 76–81.
 – Review of PocketShip; available from WoodenBoat.

External links
 PocketShip Forum
 Videos of PocketShip under sail & under construction
 Review by Robert H. Perry for Sailing Magazine, June 2009

Keelboats